Dysschema fantasma is a moth of the family Erebidae first described by Arthur Gardiner Butler in 1873. It is found in south-eastern Brazil.

References

Moths described in 1873
Dysschema